The Skanderborg–Skjern railway line is a  long standard gauge single track railway line in Denmark which runs between the cities of Skanderborg and Skjern in Central Jutland, Denmark.

The railway opened in sections. The section from Skanderborg to Silkeborg opened in 1871, the section from Silkeborg to Herning in 1877, and the section from Herning to Skjern in 1881. The line is owned and maintained by Rail Net Denmark and served with passenger trains by the railway company Arriva.

Stations

External links 

 Banedanmark
 Arriva

References

Citations

Bibliography 
 

Railway lines in Denmark
Railway lines opened in 1871
Railway lines opened in 1877
Railway lines opened in 1881
1871 establishments in Denmark
1877 establishments in Denmark
1881 establishments in Denmark
Rail transport in the Central Denmark Region